Stinna Tange Kaastrup  (born 13 July 1994) is a Danish female para-equestrian competing at Individual Championship test, Individual Freestyle test and Team test — grade Ib.

At the 2016 Summer Paralympics in Rio de Janeiro, Kaastrup and her horse, the 15 year-old Danish Warmblood gelding Horsebo Smarties, won a bronze medal with the score 73.966 percent at the Individual Championship test grade Ib event.

References 

1994 births
Living people
Danish female equestrians
Paralympic equestrians of Denmark
Equestrians at the 2016 Summer Paralympics
Paralympic bronze medalists for Denmark
Paralympic medalists in equestrian
Medalists at the 2016 Summer Paralympics
20th-century Danish women
21st-century Danish women